Bronwyn Wake is an Australian scientist and the editor in chief of Nature Climate Change.

Education 
Wake has a first class honors degree in Antarctic studies and a PhD in trace element biogeochemistry. She undertook postgraduate research at the University of Tasmania.

Career 
Wake undertook postdoctoral work at the University of Southampton, and at the European Institute for Marine Studies in Brest where she studied the cycling of trace metals in oceans and their role as micronutrients for phytoplankton.

Wake joined the editorial department of Nature Climate Change in 2012 and became the editor in chief in 2016.

Personal life 
Wake is Australian, she moved from there to London, before relocating to Scotland.

References

External links 

Living people
Academic journal editors
Australian women scientists
Alumni of the University of Southampton
University of Tasmania alumni
Academics of the University of Southampton
Year of birth missing (living people)